The 2015 FA Women's Cup Final was the 45th final of the FA Women's Cup, England's primary cup competition for women's football teams. The showpiece event was the 22nd to be played directly under the auspices of the Football Association (FA) and was named the SSE Women's FA Cup Final for sponsorship reasons. The final was contested between Chelsea Ladies and Notts County Ladies on 1 August 2015 at Wembley Stadium in London. Chelsea made its second final appearance, after losing the 2012 final. Notts County appeared in its first ever final.

It was the first Women's FA Cup Final to be staged at Wembley, and was the first women's club final there since 1993. Watched by a record crowd of 30,710 and a BBC television audience of nearly two million, Chelsea won the match 1–0, with a first-half goal from Ji So-yun. Chelsea's Eniola Aluko was named player of the match.

Route to the final
As FA WSL 1 clubs, both teams entered the competition at the fifth round stage. Chelsea beat Watford (6–0), holders Arsenal (2–1) and Manchester City (1–0) to reach the final. Notts County faced lower-division opponents in all three games, defeating Tottenham Hotspur (4–0), Aston Villa (5–1) and Everton (3–0).

The 2015 final marked the second time Chelsea had reached this stage, after losing in 2012 in a penalty shootout against Birmingham City. Notts County had never previously appeared in the final, since its founding in 2014 or as its predecessor Lincoln Ladies.

Match
After a quiet start to the game, Chelsea winger Eniola Aluko applied the first serious pressure of the game with a shot at the 30th minute. A second soon after was deflected by Notts County's goalkeeper Carly Telford. The resulting corner setup Gemma Davison for a shot which went wide. In the 37th minute, Aluko found centre forward Ji So-yun inside the box and set her up for a short range goal. Notts County came back on the attack after the half. A long-range shot from midfielder Desiree Scott was deflected and a header by Leanne Crichton in the resulting corner was narrowly cleared off the line. Chelsea hunted for a second goal but Aluko had another shot deflected while midfielder Drew Spence sent a shot wide. In the end So-yun's lone goal proved enough and Chelsea won 1–0.

Details

References

External links

 The FA Women's Cup

Cup
Women's FA Cup finals
August 2015 sports events in the United Kingdom
2015 sports events in London
FA Women's Cup Final, 2015